The 2017–18 Southern Miss Golden Eagles men's basketball team represented the University of Southern Mississippi during the 2017–18 NCAA Division I men's basketball season. The Golden Eagles, led by fourth-year head coach Doc Sadler, played their home games at Reed Green Coliseum in Hattiesburg, Mississippi as members of Conference USA. They finished the season 16–18, 7–11 in C-USA play to finish in a tie for ninth place. They defeated FIU and Middle Tennessee before losing to Marshall in the semifinals of the C-USA tournament

Previous season
The Golden Eagles finished the 2016–17 season 9–22, 6–12 in C-USA play to finish in 12th place. They lost in the first round of the C-USA tournament to Rice.

Departures

Incoming Transfers

Recruiting class of 2017

Roster

Schedule and results

|-
!colspan=9 style=|Non-conference regular season

|-
!colspan=12 style=| Conference USA regular season

|-
!colspan=12 style=| Conference USA tournament

References

Southern Miss Golden Eagles basketball seasons
Southern Miss